Ulick Burke, 3rd Earl of Clanricarde (died 1601), styled Lord Dunkellin until 1582, was an Irish peer who was the son of Richard Burke, 2nd Earl of Clanricarde and Margaret O'Brien.

Birth and origins 

{{Tree chart| |UlkR5| |RchR6| |WlmR7|y|Lettc|boxstyle=border-width: 1px; border-radius: 0.5em;
 |UlkR5=Ulick1st Marquess|boxstyle_UlkR5=border-width: 1px; border-radius: 0.5em; background: lavender;
 |RchR6=Richard6th Earl|boxstyle_RchR6=border-width: 1px; border-radius: 0.5em; background: lavender;
 |Lettc=LetticeShirley
 |WlmR7=William7th Earl'|boxstyle_WlmR7=border-width: 1px; border-radius: 0.5em; background: lavender;
 |Helen=HelenMacCarty}}

Ulick was the only son of Richard Burke and his wife Margaret O'Brien. His father was the 2nd earl of Clanricarde, called the Saxon (or Sassanach), because he succeeded by primogeniture. His mother was a daughter of Murrough O'Brien, 1st Earl of Thomond.

 Career 
He had long been a rebel against the English Crown, and since the 1560s had instigated the Mac an Iarla against his father, who was a staunch supporter of Elizabeth I. These wars wars devastated large areas in Connaught and Thomond.

On his father's death in 1582 it was uncertain who would inherit the title, Ulick or his brother, John. Ulick gained the succession by murdering John and acknowledging the supremacy of the Crown. He afterwards remained a loyal subject till his death.

 Marriage and children 
Clanricarde, as he now was, married Honora Burke, daughter of John Burke of Clogheroka, on 25 November 1564 at Athenry, County Galway. 

 
Ulick and Honora had six sons:
 Richard (died an infant) 
 Richard Burke, 4th Earl of Clanricarde (1572–1635)
 Thomas, who married Ursula Malby, daughter of Sir Nicholas Malby and widow of Anthony Brabazon
 William (died 1625), from whom later Earls descended
 Edmond Burke (died 1639)

—and at least two daughters:
 Mary (c. 1566 – before July 1604)
 Margarey de Burgh who married Sir John Bourke

Clanricarde also had an illegitimate son with Martha Frannas:
John Burke, 1st Viscount Burke of Clanmories (before 1601 – 1633)

 Arms 

 Notes and references 
 Notes 

 Citation 

 Sources 

 
  – Canonteign to Cutts (for Clanricarde)

 Further reading 
 
 Burke: People and Places, Eamon Bourke, Dublin, 1995.
 From Warlords to Landlords:Political and Social Change in Galway 1540-1640'', Bernadette Cunningham, in "Galway: History and Society", 1996.

 
 

1601 deaths
Earls of Clanricarde
Ulick
Members of the Irish House of Lords
People from County Galway
Year of birth unknown